D217 is a state road in central Croatia connecting the D1 state road to Ličko Petrovo Selo border crossing to Bihać, Bosnia and Herzegovina.

The road, as well as all other state roads in Croatia, is managed and maintained by Hrvatske ceste, state owned company.

Traffic volume 

Traffic is regularly counted and reported by Hrvatske ceste, operator of the road. Substantial seasonal variations of the traffic volume is attributed to summer tourist traffic.

Road junctions and populated areas

Maps

Sources

State roads in Croatia
Transport in Karlovac County
Lika-Senj County